The Independence Heights Residential Historic District is a  historic district in the Independence Heights neighborhood of Houston, Texas which was listed on the National Register of Historic Places in 1997.

The district is roughly bounded by N. Yale St. on the west, E. 34th St. on the north, N. Columbia St. on the east, and the I-610 on the south.  It included 125 contributing buildings.

See also

National Register of Historic Places listings in outer Harris County, Texas

References

Historic districts on the National Register of Historic Places in Texas
National Register of Historic Places in Harris County, Texas
Late 19th and Early 20th Century American Movements architecture